For Them That Trespass is a 1944 thriller novel by the British writer Ernest Raymond. Christopher Drew, a respected writer and family man, faces ruin when a past affair with a London prostitute threatens to come out.

Film adaptation
In 1949 it was adapted into a film of the same title directed by Alberto Cavalcanti and starring Stephen Murray, Richard Todd and Patricia Plunkett.

References

Bibliography
 Chibnall, Steve. J. Lee Thompson. Manchester University Press, 2000.
 Goble, Alan. The Complete Index to Literary Sources in Film. Walter de Gruyter, 1999.
 Snell, Keith. The Bibliography of Regional Fiction in Britain and Ireland, 1800–2000. Routledge, 2017.

1944 British novels
Novels set in England
Novels set in London
British thriller novels
Novels by Ernest Raymond
Cassell (publisher) books
British novels adapted into films